Krylov Seamount (also known as Albatross Seamount or Krylou Seamount) is a volcanic seamount in the Atlantic Ocean, west of the Cape Verde islands. The seamount probably formed no later than 70-75 million years ago before sinking to its current depth.

History and name 

The seamount was discovered in 1981 by a Russian research ship and named after the Russian naval engineer and mathematician Aleksey Krylov.

Geography and geomorphology 

Formerly, the whole seamount was interpreted to be an apparently volcanic breccia-filled summit caldera plus three separate summits sharing a common pedestal at  depth. The terrain of the seamount is covered by organic debris, which with depth gives way to pillow lavas; marine sediments cover much of the outer slopes of the seamount. The seafloor under Krylov is about 95 million years old.

Geology and geochronology  

The seamount was probably formed by a mantle diapir with eruptions occurring along fissures and in association with the Mid-Atlantic Ridge. It probably began to form no less than 70-75 million years ago, as reefs of that age containing coccoliths, corals and foraminifers have been found on the seamount; they also indicate that the seamount was emergent at that time. Corals, golden corals, sea stars and sponges have been found at Krylov Seamount.

Composition 

Compositionally, the seamount is formed by alkali basalts and hydrothermally altered basalts containing palagonite and plagioclase with additional clay, hyaloclastite and palygorskite; additionally it features biogenic limestone, carbonate sands, carbonate sandstone, corals, foraminifera sands, iron-manganese crusts, muddy sands, sands, shelly debris and volcanic breccia. The volcanic rocks display some geochemical differences between the western ridge and the eastern summit.

Vernadite is among the most important components of the iron-manganese crusts, followed by manganese-containing feroxyhyte; additional components are apatite, asbolane, birnessite, buserite, goethite, mica smectite, smectite, palygorskite, quartz, todorokite and zeolites. The formation of the iron-manganese crusts was influenced by hydrothermal activity, when Krylov Seamount was close to the Mid-Atlantic Ridge about 97 million years ago (Cenomanian).

References

Sources 

 
 
 
 

Seamounts of the Atlantic Ocean
Cretaceous volcanoes